Spy in the Wild is a British nature documentary television series, produced by BBC Natural History Unit, John Downer Productions and PBS. The series, which is directed and produced by John Downer, premiered in 2017 with a second series in 2020. The employment of animatronics makes it possible to document interactive behaviour no animal would have shown towards a human filmmaker or in front of a hidden camera.

Broadcast
The first series ran for five episodes from 12 January 2017 and concluded on 3 February 2017, and aired on BBC One. The series focuses on the complex emotions and ethology of animals, using more than 30 specially built animatronic "spy creatures", often shaped like the offsprings of the species.

The series was narrated by David Tennant in the original version, while Brian Unger provides substitute narration in the American PBS version as it was broadcast under Nature Special Presentation series.

Spy creatures

Spy creatures included:

Series overview

Episodes

Season 1 (2017)

Season 2 (2020)

Reception 
Tim Goodman of The Hollywood Reporter wrote, "Pretty incredible."

Merchandise

DVD and Blu-ray
A two-disc DVD and two-disc Blu-ray set for the series were released on 20 March 2017. Both were distributed by Spirit Entertainment in the UK.

In the United States and Canada, the DVDs are divided into two parts and they were released on 28 February and 15 August 2017. Both DVDs were retain with David Tennant's narration from the original British broadcasts.

References

External links

Spy in the Wild at PBS

2017 British television series debuts
2020 British television series endings
2010s British documentary television series
2020s British documentary television series
BBC high definition shows
BBC television documentaries
Documentary films about nature
English-language television shows